Mino del Reame, also known as Mino dal Reame, was a 15th-century Neapolitan Italian Renaissance sculptor from Naples.

History
He was active in Rome from about 1460 to 1480.

Giorgio Vasari in his Lives of the Most Excellent Painters, Sculptors, and Architects recounts that Mino del Reame was a boastful sculptor whose work was inferior to that of his modest contemporary Paolo Romano.

The Cleveland Museum of Art has sculptures by Mino del Reame in its collection.

References 
 Douglas, R. Langton, Mino del Reame, The Burlington Magazine for Connoisseurs, Vol. 88, No. 514 (Jan., 1946), 23. 
 Vasari, Giorgio, Le Vite delle più eccellenti pittori, scultori, ed architettori, many editions and translations.

Italian Renaissance sculptors
Artists from Naples
15th-century Italian sculptors
Italian male sculptors
15th-century Neapolitan people